Tinea translucens is a moth belonging to the family Tineidae. The species was first described by Edward Meyrick in 1917.

It has a cosmopolitan distribution.

References

Tineinae
Moths described in 1917
Cosmopolitan moths